Stoke Albany is a village and civil parish in North Northamptonshire. It is off the A427 road between Market Harborough and Corby, about halfway between the two. At the time of the 2001 census, the parish's population was 330 people, increasing to 390 (including Brampton Ash and Little Bowden) at the 2011 census.

The village's name means 'outlying homestead/settlement'. The village was held by William de Albinni in 1155. The western piece of Corby hundred shaped a different hundred named 'Stoke'.

St Botolph's Church is a Grade II* listed building.

References

External links

Villages in Northamptonshire
Civil parishes in Northamptonshire
North Northamptonshire